International Airport Namangan  is an airport in western part of the city of Namangan in Uzbekistan.

Airlines and destinations

See also
List of the busiest airports in the former USSR
Transportation in Uzbekistan

References

External links

Airports in Uzbekistan
Namangan Region
Namangan